HSBC Bank Malta plc is the Maltese subsidiary of the British multinational banking and financial services company HSBC. The company is headquartered in Qormi and operates over 30 branches and offices throughout the islands of Malta and Gozo. HSBC Bank Malta is part of the European region within HSBC and therefore reports to HSBC Bank plc.

History

HSBC Malta dates back to the commencement of operations in Malta by the Anglo-Egyptian Bank (est. 1864), which merged with the National Bank of South Africa and Colonial Bank (est. 1836) to become Barclays Bank Dominion Colonial Overseas in 1925 after Barclays acquired the Colonial Bank when it acquired the London Provincial and South Western Bank in 1918. In 1954 the bank shortened its name to Barclays Bank D.C.O. and in 1971 became Barclays Bank International.

Nationalisation

In 1975 the government of Malta nationalized Barclays Bank International's operations in Malta and renamed it Mid-Med Bank, exercising its option to purchase Barclays’ remaining shareholding in Mid-Med in 1979.

In 1991 the Maltese government sold 33% of Mid-Med Bank to the public and in 1993 Mid-Med listed on Malta’s stock exchange. Mid-Med acquired 25% of Lohombus Bank, which specializes in housing finance, in 1995 along with the Investment Finance Bank in Malta. Mid-Med gained a majority of Lohombus Bank in Malta when it acquired another 35% of the firm in 1996, the same year it established a representative office in London.

Mid-Med joins the HSBC Group

Midland Bank was the first foreign bank to be granted an unlimited banking licence in Malta, where it opened a branch in September 1996.  Then in 1999, Midland Bank acquired the government of Malta’s 67.1% direct holding in Mid-Med, as well its 2.7% indirect holdings. Part of the agreement was that for the time being the bank would continue to be listed in the Maltese stock market and that Midland would not make a formal offer for the remainder of the shares but could buy if other shareholders chose to sell.  At the time, Mid-Med bank had 60 offices and branches, 1,800 staff and was the largest commercial bank in Malta.

When HSBC brought all its operations under a common name, Mid-Med became HSBC Malta Bank plc. HSBC absorbed Mid-Med’s representative offices in Dubai, Milan, and Luxembourg into the HSBC offices in their respective countries but established a "Malta Desk" in several of these countries.  Lohombus Bank became HSBC Malta (Home Loans) Ltd.

Malta Call Centre

In April 2006 HSBC announced that it would be opening a new call centre in Malta, with an investment of €7 million and the creation of 350 jobs. The centre will deal with calls from HSBC Bank's customers in the United Kingdom, and operate as a branch of that company, under the oversight of HSBC Malta management.

See also

 HSBC Bank plc (direct parent company)
 HSBC Holdings plc (ultimate parent company)

References

Sources

Consiglio, John A. 2006. A history of banking in Malta, 1506-2005. Valletta: Progress Press.

External links
HSBC Bank Malta website
HSBC Group website

Banks of Malta
Banks established in 1999
Malta
1999 establishments in Malta
Companies listed on the Malta Stock Exchange
Companies based in Valletta
Banks under direct supervision of the European Central Bank